The Institute for Medical Engineering and Science or IMES is a research institute at the Massachusetts Institute of Technology that aims to combine engineering, medicine, and science to solve challenges in human health. The institute was established in 2012 and is currently directed by Elazer Edelman. Some core faculty members include Alex K. Shalek, Emery Brown, and Ellen Roche.

IMES serves to bring together scientific advances with clinical medicine by serving as the point of intersection with major hospitals and industry partners. IMES is also the MIT home for the Harvard–MIT Program in Health Sciences and Technology.

References

External links
 

Engineering research institutes
Massachusetts Institute of Technology
Biotechnology organizations
Laboratories in the United States
Medical research institutes in Massachusetts
Multidisciplinary research institutes
Research institutes established in 2012
2012 establishments in Massachusetts